Olli Vainio (born 23 April 1994) is a Finnish ice hockey defenceman who currently playing for HK Poprad of the Slovak Extraliga.

Career
In 2021 Olli Vainio signed a contract in Porin Ässät.

Career statistics

Regular season and playoffs

References

External links
 

Living people
1994 births
Finnish ice hockey defencemen
Ilves players
Lempäälän Kisa players
KOOVEE players
Lukko players
Ässät players
HK Poprad players
Ice hockey people from Tampere
Finnish expatriate ice hockey players in Slovakia